Štefan Cuk (born 19 August 1962) is a Slovenian judoka. He competed in the men's half-lightweight event at the 1992 Summer Olympics.

References

External links
 

1962 births
Living people
Slovenian male judoka
Olympic judoka of Slovenia
Judoka at the 1992 Summer Olympics
Sportspeople from Celje